Kapari may refer to:

 Kapari (village) in Kerman Province, Iran
 Kapari (magazine) published from Telangana, India

See also